The 1978 Israel Super Cup was the eighth Israel Super Cup (13th, including unofficial matches, as the competition wasn't played within the Israel Football Association in its first 5 editions, until 1969), an annual Israel football match played between the winners of the previous season's Top Division and Israel State Cup. 

The match was played between Maccabi Netanya, champions of the 1977–78 Liga Leumit and Beitar Jerusalem, runners-up in the league, as Maccabi Netanya won the 1977–78 Israel State Cup.

This was Maccabi Netanya's 3rd Israel Super Cup appearance and Beitar's Second. At the match, played at Maccabi Netanya Stadium, Maccabi Netanya won 4–0.

Match details

References

1978
Super Cup
Super Cup 1978
Super Cup 1978
Israel Super Cup matches